CrashBurn is an Australian 13-part drama series airing on Network Ten, about surviving long-term relationships in an age where multiple partners and multiple orgasms are considered a birthright.

It starred Catherine McClements and Aaron Blabey as Rosie and Ben Harfield, a couple whose marriage troubles send them to a counsellor. Most of the episodes are shown in two parts: half 'He says' (Ben's view of the situation) and half 'She says' (Rosie's view). Most of the episodes used flashbacks to an earlier part of their relationship when the trouble started. Also appearing is the couple, Candice and Richard (played by Liz Burch and Richard Piper), who are also seeking counselling and run into Rosie and Ben's lives. There are numerous problems arising in the course of the series, not least Ben's affair with Rosie's best friend, Abby (Sacha Horler). Although the series was not a huge hit, it was noted for its fine performances (notably Sacha Horler and Catherine McClements).

Cast
Catherine McClements as Rosie Denton Harfield
Aaron Blabey as Ben Harfield
Sacha Horler as Abby
Liz Burch as Candice
Veronica Sywak as Emily
Richard Piper as Richard
Grant Piro as Adam
Bob Franklin as Theo
Carmen Duncan as Anna Denton
Wayne Hope as Phillip
Christen O'Leary as Marianne
Orpheus Pledger as Lewis Harfield
Maria Theodorakis as Liv
Simon Roborgh as Barman

Notable guest cast
Kat Stewart - Mandy
William McInnes - Colin
Pamela Rabe - Lawyer
Judi Farr - Marg
Brendan O'Connor - Garry
Andrea McEwan - Lucinda
Adam Zwar - Tat
Kym Gyngell - Abby's father

External links
Australian Television Archive
CrashBurn at the Internet Movie Database
Cashburn at the National Film and Sound Archive

APRA Award winners
Network 10 original programming
Australian drama television series
Australian television soap operas